Schrei – Live is a live DVD released by the German band Tokio Hotel on April 7, 2006. It was recorded on March 11, 2006 at the König Pilsener Arena in Oberhausen, Germany during the 2006 leg of their Schrei Tour.

Track listing

Bonus Content 
 One Night in Tokio
 Bildergallerie

Chart positions

Weekly charts

Certifications

References

Tokio Hotel live albums
Tokio Hotel video albums
2006 live albums
2006 video albums
German-language live albums
German-language video albums
Live video albums